Israyel Hakobkokhyan (born 21 January 1960) is an Armenian boxer. He competed for the Soviet Union in the men's welterweight event at the 1980 Summer Olympics.

References

External links
 

1960 births
Living people
Soviet male boxers
Armenian male boxers
Olympic boxers of the Soviet Union
Boxers at the 1980 Summer Olympics
Sportspeople from Yerevan
Soviet Armenians
AIBA World Boxing Championships medalists
Welterweight boxers